Telmatobius arequipensis is a species of frog in the family Telmatobiidae. It is endemic to southern Peru (Arequipa Region, Moquegua Region, and/or Puno Region). It has an altitudinal range of  asl. Two subspecies have been described, Telmatobius arequipensis arequipensis and Telmatobius arequipensis natator Vellard, 1955. Its common name is Chili water frog, after its type locality near Río Chili.

Telmatobius arequipensis is a riparian semi-aquatic frog. It is present in streams, wet grassland and shrublands, and ditches. It may be found in modified habitats wherever there are streams or ditches. Eggs are laid in the water.

Telmatobius arequipensis is common where it occurs, but populations can be threatened by water pollution. It is also collected for food and traditional medicine. Chytridiomycosis may also be a threat. It is present in the Salinas and Aguada Blanca National Reservation.

References

arequipensis
Amphibians of the Andes
Amphibians of Peru
Endemic fauna of Peru
Amphibians described in 1955
Taxonomy articles created by Polbot